Spyridon "Spyros" Gianniotis (born 19 February 1980) is a Greek competitive swimmer who specialises in long-distance and open-water freestyle events. He is an Olympic silver medalist, two-time World Champion, World Cup gold medalist, and two-time European Champion. A five-time Olympian, Gianniotis has won a total of 15 medals in major international long-course competition, totalling 5 gold, 5 silver, and 5 bronze spanning the Olympics, the World Championships, the World Cup and the European Championships. In 2011 he won the World Open Water Swimmer of the Year award, becoming the first and only Greek swimmer to earn that distinction. 

He was named the Greek Male Athlete of the Year, for the years 2011, 2012, and 2013. He won the silver medal at the 2016 Olympic Games in Rio at the 10 km marathon swim. Initially, Gianniotis was given as the gold medalist as he appeared to cross the finish line first, but the Dutchman Ferry Weertman touched the timing pad before him. After 15 minutes of deliberations by the judges and the use of photo finish, Weertman was awarded the gold medal and Gianniotis the silver, despite the fact that both were credited with the same time: 1 hour, 52 minutes, 59.8 seconds (1:52:59.8). Gianniotis won the silver medal at the age of 36, being the oldest competitor in the event.

Career
He won three individual medals at the 2005 Mediterranean Games. He has represented Greece at five consecutive Summer Olympics, starting in 2000. In 2011 he became world champion in the 10 km open water at the world championships in Shanghai. Gianniotis also claimed gold at the 2013 World Aquatics Championships in Barcelona in the men's 10 km open water swimming.

At the 2004 Olympic Games in Athens Gianniotis took the 5th place in the 1500 m freestyle and the 7th place at 400 m freestyle. At the 2012 Olympic Games in London, he was 4th at the 10 km marathon swim, missing the bronze medal by 5 seconds.

References

External links
 

1980 births
Living people
Male long-distance swimmers
Greek male swimmers
Greek male freestyle swimmers
Olympic swimmers of Greece
Swimmers at the 2000 Summer Olympics
Swimmers at the 2004 Summer Olympics
Swimmers at the 2008 Summer Olympics
Swimmers at the 2012 Summer Olympics
Swimmers at the 2016 Summer Olympics
World Aquatics Championships medalists in open water swimming
European Aquatics Championships medalists in swimming
Olympic silver medalists for Greece
Olympic silver medalists in swimming
Medalists at the 2016 Summer Olympics
Mediterranean Games gold medalists for Greece
Mediterranean Games silver medalists for Greece
Mediterranean Games bronze medalists for Greece
Swimmers at the 2001 Mediterranean Games
Swimmers at the 2005 Mediterranean Games
Mediterranean Games medalists in swimming
European Open Water Swimming Championships medalists
Sportspeople from Liverpool